Wheelers Lane Technology College (formerly Wheelers Lane Boys' School) is a secondary school for boys located in the Kings Heath area of Birmingham, in the West Midlands of England.

It is a non-selective community school administered by Birmingham City Council. The school also has previously been awarded specialist status as a Technology College.

Wheelers Lane Technology College offers GCSEs and BTECs as programmes of study for pupils.

Notable former pupils
James O'Connor, former football player
Ian Westwood, retired Cricket player, former captain of Warwickshire Cricket Club

References

External links
Wheelers Lane Technology College official website
UK Gov - Get Information about Schools

Boys' schools in the West Midlands (county)
Secondary schools in Birmingham, West Midlands
Community schools in Birmingham, West Midlands